Twelve men have been the president or chancellor at East Carolina University.  In 1972, ECU joined the UNC system, which changed the name of the chief administrator at East Carolina.  The chancellor is chosen by the UNC board of governors on the recommendation of the UNC BOG president.  Above the chancellor is the board of trustees.  Four of the twelve trustees are picked by the governor of North Carolina. The student body president sits on the board ex officio.

Presidents of East Carolina University

Chancellors of East Carolina University

Timeline

External links
 Presidents/Chancellors Biographies

East Carolina